Francis W. Rockwell may refer to:
 Francis W. Rockwell (politician)
 Francis W. Rockwell (admiral)